Sharjah Team is a UCI Continental team founded in 2015 and based in the UAE. It participates in UCI Continental Circuits races.

Roster in 2018

Major wins
2016
Stage 4 Tour Eritrea, Elyas Afewerki
Stage 1 Tour du Sénégal, Abderrahmane Mansouri
Tour de Tunisie, Abderrahmane Mansouri
2018
Stage 2 Tour International de la Wilaya d'Oran, Oleksandr Golovash

National champions
2016
 Algeria Road Race, Abderrahmane Mansouri

References

UCI Continental Teams (Asia)
Cycling teams based in the United Arab Emirates
Cycling teams established in 2015
2015 establishments in the United Arab Emirates